The Hemioniscidae  are a family of marine isopod crustaceans in the suborder Cymothoida. The original description was made by Bonnier in 1900. Members of this family are parasitic on cirripede barnacles.

The family contains these genera and species:
Hemioniscus Buchholz, 1866
Hemioniscus balani Buchholtz, 1866
Hemioniscus pagurophilus Williams & Boyko, 2006
Leponiscus Giard, 1887
Leponiscus alepadis Gruvel, 1901
Leponiscus anatifae Giard, 1887
Leponiscus pollicipedis Giard, 1887
Scalpelloniscus Grygier, 1981
Scalpelloniscus binoculis (Menzies & George, 1972)
Scalpelloniscus nieli Hosie, 2008
Scalpelloniscus penicillatus Grygier, 1981
Scalpelloniscus vomicus Hosie, 2008

References

Cymothoida
Crustacean families